Bedevostan-e Gharbi Rural District is in Khvajeh District of Heris County, East Azerbaijan province, Iran. At the National Census of 2006, its population was 16,259 in 3,729 households. There were 16,026 inhabitants in 4,265 households at the following census of 2011. At the most recent census of 2016, the population of the rural district was 16,242 in 4,728 households. The largest of its 25 villages was Arbatan, with 3,233 people.

References 

Heris County

Rural Districts of East Azerbaijan Province

Populated places in East Azerbaijan Province

Populated places in Heris County